Anne Margrethe Bredal (1655-1729), was a Danish scholar and feminist writer.

She was the daughter of the vicar Jens Pedersen Bredal and Marie Holgersdatter. She married Niels Sørensen (d. ca. 1694)  in 1677 and principal Erik Bredal (d 1735) in 1697. She was active as a governess in 1675-1677. During her first arranged marriage, she was forced to spend all her time to the household and family economy because of the health of her spouse. She spoke in favor of education for women and claimed that all women would be able to raise above their present intellect if they were but given education, and presented Anna Maria van Schurman and Birgitte Thott as role models.

Bredal was mentioned in contemporary dictionaries of female scholars by among others Albert Thura and Frederik Christian Schønau. She wrote an autobiography in 1703.

References

1655 births
1729 deaths
17th-century Danish writers
Danish feminists
17th-century Danish women writers
Danish women memoirists
17th-century Danish memoirists
18th-century Danish memoirists